The Santa Margarida Volcano is an extinct volcano in the comarca of Garrotxa, Catalonia, Spain. The volcano has a perimeter of 2 kilometers and a height of 682 meters and is part of the Zona Volcànica de la Garrotxa Natural Park. The hermitage of Santa Margarida, after which the volcano was named, is inside the crater of the volcano. The building was destroyed in 1428 during the 1428 Catalonia earthquake and rebuilt in 1865.

Geology
A study published in 2011 at the Journal of Volcanology and Geothermal Research indicated that the Santa Margarida and Croscat volcanoes were the product of the same eruption event 11,500 years ago, alternating freatomagmatic activity, between water and magma, and magmatic activity.

Gallery

See also
 List of volcanoes in Spain

References

External links

Official Website
Olot Volcanic Field - Global Volcanism Program

Garrotxa
Mountains of Catalonia
Volcanoes of the Mediterranean Sea
Volcanoes of Catalonia